Tipa Te'i Galeai (born February 26, 1997) is an American football outside linebacker. He was signed by the Packers as an undrafted free agent in 2020 following his college football career with the TCU Horned Frogs and the Utah State Aggies.

Professional career
Galeai signed with the Green Bay Packers as an undrafted free agent following the 2020 NFL Draft on April 29, 2020. He was waived during final roster cuts on September 5, 2020, and was signed to the practice squad the next day. He was elevated to the active roster on September 12 for the week 1 game against the Minnesota Vikings, and then reverted to the team's practice squad following the game. On January 25, 2021, Galeai signed a reserve/futures contract with the Packers.

On August 31, 2021, Packers released Galeai as part of their final roster cuts. He was signed to the practice squad the next day. He was promoted to the active roster on November 16 to replace an injured Whitney Mercilus. On December 25, he recorded his first career sack on Baker Mayfield during a 24–22 win against the Cleveland Browns.

Galeai made the Packers' initial 53-man roster for the 2022 NFL season. On October 15, 2022, he was placed on injured reserve. He was released on December 27, 2022.

NFL career statistics

Regular season

Postseason

References

External links
TCU Horned Frogs bio
Utah State Aggies bio

1997 births
Living people
People from Euless, Texas
Players of American football from Texas
Sportspeople from the Dallas–Fort Worth metroplex
American football linebackers
Utah State Aggies football players
Green Bay Packers players
TCU Horned Frogs football players